The Goose River Bank in Mayville, North Dakota was designed by John W. Ross and was built in 1898.  It was listed on the National Register of Historic Places in 1985.

References

Romanesque Revival architecture in North Dakota
Commercial buildings completed in 1898
Bank buildings on the National Register of Historic Places in North Dakota
1898 establishments in North Dakota
National Register of Historic Places in Traill County, North Dakota
Mayville, North Dakota